Mareeba State High School is a school in Mareeba, Queensland, Australia. It currently has 730 students across the six grades and was established in 1960. Currently Scott Whybird is the principal. Mareeba State High School consists of four different sports houses, these consist of McKinlay, Kennedy, Leichart and Gregory

Notable alumni
Sport
Ben Hampton (rugby league)
Aron Baynes (basketball)

References

Public high schools in Queensland
Schools in Far North Queensland
Educational institutions established in 1960
1960 establishments in Australia